PC/DC  Christopher Daniel "Chris" Skelton is a fictional character in BBC One's science fiction/police procedural drama, Life on Mars and its spin-off Ashes to Ashes.

Life on Mars 

The character of Chris Skelton has been described as a "dogsbody" who is a "cheeky but likeable character" by the BBC's Life on Mars website. Throughout both series of Life on Mars, Skelton finds himself torn between the "old and the new ways of policing", represented by Gene Hunt (Philip Glenister) and Sam Tyler (John Simm) respectively.

He is generally regarded as a waste of space by Hunt throughout both series and plays only minor roles in the storylines that unfold. Skelton finally proves himself in series 2 episode 6, saving Hunt, Tyler and Annie Cartwright (Liz White) from death when he shoots Big Bird.

Unlike Ray Carling (Dean Andrews), Skelton eventually comes to respect Tyler and begins to emulate his modern policing methods, such as tape-recording interviews years before it became standard procedure. Tyler also helps Skelton overcome his clumsiness, nervousness and naivety. During the finale of Life on Mars, Skelton informs Tyler: "I don't underestimate you Boss, I just don't understand you".

Ashes to Ashes

Alongside Gene Hunt and Ray Carling, Chris moved from Manchester to London and joined the Metropolitan Police shortly after the death of Sam Tyler in 1980.

By the time in which Ashes to Ashes is set in 1981, eight years since that of Life on Mars set in 1973, Chris' confidence, maturity and policing skills are displayed to have improved. During one episode, he described himself as "cautious rather than nervous" (as opposed to his demeanour in Life on Mars).

During the programme, Chris enters into a relationship with fellow officer Sharon Granger (Montserrat Lombard). Chris proposes to her in the second episode of season two and they become engaged.

Series two of Ashes to Ashes follows Gene Hunt and Alex Drake battling to put an end to police corruption and searching for an officer who is fabricating and disposing of evidence within Fenchurch East CID. During the penultimate episode of the second series, Chris is revealed to be the mole in CID, explaining that to pay for an engagement ring for Shaz he accepted money from corrupt officers. Chris initially thought that he could infiltrate the group and learn who was involved, but the more tasks he performed, the more involved he became, and he found it impossible to tell either Hunt or Drake about what was happening to him.

Ashamed, Chris quietly attempts to resign from CID. A disgusted Hunt views the resignation as cowardice and refuses, telling him that although Chris will not go to prison, he has no choice but to stay on and bear the consequences of his betrayal.

The revelation of his betrayal ostracizes him within CID and casts serious doubts on his relationship with Shaz. However, in the final episode of the second series, Chris puts himself in danger by agreeing to go along with the corrupt officers' robbery plan; this eases tensions between Chris and the other characters and his relationship with Shaz recovers, as she admits that she still loves him because "he cares when he gets it wrong".

During episode one of the third series, it is revealed that Chris and Shaz have split up, though the details are undisclosed; however, in episode 6 series 3, when he and Ray believe they are about to die, Chris says that if he does not make it, Ray should tell Shaz that Chris still loves her.

In episode 7 series 3, Chris's working relationship with Hunt is strained due to him laughing at a mishap at Viv James's funeral and spilling his drink at the wake. Chris then disobeys an order from Hunt and the two fight in the office. Later on, Chris refers to Hunt as "the best DCI I've ever had" and says he is "proud to have worked under [him]"; however, he also tells Hunt, "I'm not going to be your doormat any longer. Those days are over." After this, the two of them make up.

Throughout the third season, Chris, Shaz, and Ray all have disturbing and intrusive visions of a sky of stars, and at times hear strange voices, like those heard in a pub. In episode seven, following the resolution of his argument with Hunt, Chris says he recognises the voice as that of Nelson (Tony Marshall), the landlord of The Railway Arms from Life on Mars, asking him what he is having to drink.

Finale

During the finale it is revealed that, in reality, Skelton was dead. On 14 February 1975, whilst serving as a uniformed constable, his Sergeant told him to "do as he is told", which was for Chris to move out into the open at the blow of his Sergeant's whistle, resulting in him being gunned down and killed. Chris ponders on how he acted as a dogsbody for the Sergeant and did absolutely whatever he asked, just like his relationship with DCI Hunt, which he changes after standing up to Hunt in series three, episode seven.

He reunites with Shaz when she kisses him before entering The Railway Arms and crossing over to the other side. She tells him that she loves him "forever and a day", to which he responds: "Fab."

References

External links
 BBC Site character profile
 Bravo site character profile

Life on Mars (TV series) characters
Fictional British police detectives
Television characters introduced in 2006